Solís is a resort (balneario) in the Maldonado Department of southeastern Uruguay.

Geography
The resort is located on the coast of Río de la Plata, on Route 10 and close to its junction with Ruta Interbalnearia. To its west flows the stream Arroyo Solís Grande, which is the natural border with the Costa de Oro of Canelones Department. To its east it borders the resort Bella Vista.

Population
In 2011 Solís had a population of 288 permanent inhabitants and 632 dwellings.
 
Source: Instituto Nacional de Estadística de Uruguay

References

External links

INE map of Solís and Bella Vista

Populated places in the Maldonado Department
Seaside resorts in Uruguay